Eric Michael Cole (born September 21, 1976) is an American actor, producer, and editor.

Early life
Cole was born in Sacramento, California. He grew up in the Pacific Northwest, living in Hillsboro, Oregon, and Vancouver, Washington.

Career
His break-through role was in White Squall (1996) directed by Ridley Scott. Cole appeared in the television film Gia (1998) with Angelina Jolie. Additionally, he starred in, co-produced and edited In Memory of My Father (2005).

In 2018, he appeared on the Alice in Chains' music videos "The One You Know" and "Never Fade".

Filmography

References

External links

Eric Michael Cole Official Website: ericmichaelcole.com

1976 births
20th-century American male actors
21st-century American male actors
American male film actors
American male television actors
Hillsboro High School (Oregon) alumni
Living people
Male actors from Sacramento, California
People from Hillsboro, Oregon
People from Vancouver, Washington